Cayden Lapcevich (born 3 November 1999) is a former NASCAR Pinty's Series driver who competed from 2015 to 2017. During his career, Lapcevich won the 2016 NASCAR Pinty's Series championship with three wins and was the "youngest champion ever in Canadian professional auto racing". During the 2016 season, Lapevich was named the Jostens Rookie of the Year. After winning three additional races in his final Pinty's season, Lapcevich was awarded the Canadian Motorsport Hall of Fame Rising Star Award in 2017. Outside of competing, Lapcevich was a crew chief for Andrew Ranger in 2022.

Early life and education
On 3 November 1999, Lapcevich was born in Grimsby, Ontario. For his post-secondary education, Lapcevich went to the University of Northwestern Ohio to complete a program in racecar construction.

Career
Lapcevich began his motorsport throughout his childhood in road racing. He later won multiple midget car racing championships before settling on stock car racing. Between 2014 and 2015, Lapcevich won the Ontario Super Stock championship before entering the NASCAR Pinty's Series. In Lapcevich's first Pinty's Series season, he competed in six races and had one top five finish in 2015. 

The following season, Lapcevich won the 2016 NASCAR Pinty's Series championship with three race wins and was the "youngest champion ever in Canadian professional auto racing". That year, he received the Jostens Rookie of the Year award. Before the start of the 2017 NASCAR Pinty's Series season, Lapcevich was selected as a member of the NASCAR Next developmental program. After winning three additional races during the 2017 Pinty's Series, Lapcevich ended his NASCAR career in 2018 when his sponsor went bankrupt. He appeared in limited races such as the 2018 Canadian Short Track Nationals while attending college.

He then raced at select events in the United States. Lapcevich won the late model portion of the 2019 Glass City 200 at Toledo Speedway. He took second to Ty Majeski at the 2020 Dixieland 250 ARCA Midwest Tour race at Wisconsin International Raceway in August ahead of drivers such as Kyle Busch, Johnny Sauter, and Derek Kraus. In 2022, Lapecvich became a crew chief for Andrew Ranger.

Awards and honours
In 2017, Lapcevich was given the Canadian Motorsport Hall of Fame Rising Star Award.

Motorsports career results

NASCAR
(key) (Bold – Pole position awarded by qualifying time. Italics – Pole position earned by points standings or practice time. * – Most laps led.)

Pinty's Series

References

External links
 

1999 births
NASCAR drivers
Living people
Racing drivers from Ontario
ARCA Midwest Tour drivers
People from Grimsby, Ontario
NASCAR crew chiefs